Catriona urquisa is a species of sea slug, an aeolid nudibranch, a marine gastropod mollusk in the family Trinchesiidae.

Distribution
This species was described from Ifaluk Atoll, Caroline Islands.

References

Trinchesiidae
Gastropods described in 1965